Alias bin Razak is a Malaysian politician and currently serves as Terengganu State Executive Councillor.

Election results

Honours
  :
  Knight Commander of the Order of the Crown of Terengganu (DPMT) – Dato' (2022)

References

Living people
People from Terengganu
Malaysian people of Malay descent
Malaysian Muslims
Malaysian Islamic Party politicians
Members of the Terengganu State Legislative Assembly
Terengganu state executive councillors
21st-century Malaysian politicians
Year of birth missing (living people)